"The Crocodile" (Krokodil) is a short story by Fyodor Dostoyevsky that was first published in 1865 in his magazine Epoch. It is a work of satire, parodying political, social and economic themes prevailing in Russia at the time.

Synopsis
The story relates the events that befall one Ivan Matveich when he, his wife Elena Ivanovna, and the narrator visit the Passage on Nevsky Avenue to see a crocodile that has been put on display by a German entrepreneur. After teasing the crocodile, Ivan Matveich is swallowed alive. He finds the inside of the crocodile to be quite comfortable, and the animal's owner refuses to allow it to be cut open, in spite of the pleas from Elena Ivanovna. Ivan Matveich urges the narrator to arrange for the crocodile to be purchased and cut open, but the owner asks so much for it that nothing is done. As the story ends Elena Ivanovna is contemplating divorce and Ivan Matveich resolves to carry on his work as a civil servant as best he can from inside the crocodile.

References

External links
Full text in English at Project Gutenberg
Text, comments, and footnotes in Russian
 

1865 short stories
Short stories by Fyodor Dostoyevsky